La Parisienne (French for "The Parisian Song") is a famous song by Casimir Delavigne. It was composed after the July Revolution and in homage to it and served as the French national anthem during the July Monarchy (1830-1848).

It is sung to the tune of "Ein Schifflein sah Ich Fahren," a German military march, and was harmonized by Daniel Auber.

Lyrics

French
1

Peuple Français, peuple de braves,
La Liberté rouvre ses bras ;
On nous disait : soyez esclaves !
Nous avons dit : soyons soldats !
Soudain Paris, dans sa mémoire
A retrouvé son cri de gloire :
En avant, marchons
Contre les canons ;
À travers le fer, le feu des bataillons,
Courons à la victoire. (bis)

2

Serrez vos rangs, qu'on se soutienne !
Marchons ! chaque enfant de Paris
De sa cartouche citoyenne
Fait une offrande à son pays ;
Ô jour d'éternelle mémoire !
Paris n'a plus qu'un cri de gloire :
En avant, marchons
Contre les canons ;
À travers le fer, le feu des bataillons,
Courons à la victoire. (bis)

3

La mitraille en vain nous dévore,
Elle enfante des combattants ;
Sous les boulets voyez éclore
Ces vieux généraux de vingt ans.
Ô jour d'éternelle mémoire !
Paris n'a plus qu'un cri de gloire :
En avant, marchons
Contre les canons ;
À travers le fer, le feu des bataillons,
Courons à la victoire. (bis)

4

Pour briser leurs masses profondes,
Qui conduit nos drapeaux sanglants ?
C'est la liberté des deux Mondes,
C'est Lafayette en cheveux blancs.
Ô jour d'éternelle mémoire !
Paris n'a plus qu'un cri de gloire :
En avant, marchons
Contre les canons ;
À travers le fer, le feu des bataillons,
Courons à la victoire. (bis)

5

Les trois couleurs sont revenus,
Et la colonne, avec fierté,
Fait briller à travers les nues
L'arc-en-ciel de sa liberté,
Ô jour d'éternelle mémoire !
Paris n'a plus qu'un cri de gloire :
En avant, marchons
Contre les canons ;
À travers le fer, le feu des bataillons,
Courons à la victoire. (bis)

6

Soldat du drapeau tricolore,
D'Orléans ! roi qui l'a porté,
Ton sang se mêlerait encore
À celui qu'il nous a couté.
Ô jour d'éternelle mémoire !
Paris n'a plus qu'un cri de gloire :
En avant, marchons
Contre les canons ;
À travers le fer, le feu des bataillons,
Courons à la victoire. (bis)

7

Tambours, du convoi de nos frères,
Roulez le funèbre signal ;
Et nous, de lauriers populaires
Chargeons leur cercueil triomphal.
Ô temple de deuil et de gloire !
Panthéon, reçois leur mémoire !
Portons-les marchons
Découvrons nos fronts
Soyez immortels vous tous que nous pleurons,
Martyrs de la victoire. (bis)

Notes

See also
Casimir Delavigne
July Revolution

Historical national anthems
National symbols of France
French anthems
July Monarchy
19th-century songs
Year of song unknown